Sasahara Tameike Dam is an earthen dam located in Saga Prefecture in Japan. The dam is used for irrigation. The catchment area of the dam is 6.2 km2. The dam impounds about 1  ha of land when full and can store 118 thousand cubic meters of water.

References

Dams in Saga Prefecture
1970 establishments in Japan